Carposina altivaga is a moth in the family Carposinidae. It was described by Edward Meyrick in 1925. It is found in the Democratic Republic of the Congo.

References

Carposinidae
Moths described in 1925
Moths of Africa
Endemic fauna of the Democratic Republic of the Congo